Nancy Jane Steen (born January 31, 1950 in Shoreview, Minnesota) is an American television producer, writer and actress.

Career
Steen began her career as an actress at Dudley Riggs' Brave New Workshop in Minneapolis, Minnesota. After graduating from the University of Minnesota in 1972, she studied with Jacques Lecoq in Paris. She then moved to Los Angeles, where she appeared in such television series as Charlie's Angels, Taxi, Mork & Mindy, and M*A*S*H. In 1980, she wrote for the ABC-TV series Police Squad! and Happy Days. 

Her television producing and writing credits also include Happy Days, Night Court, Married... with Children, Caroline in the City, Titus, Roseanne, The Love Boat, Jesse, What I Like About You, Kirk and I'm with Her.

References

External links 
 

Living people
1950 births
American television actresses
American television producers
American women television producers
American television writers
University of Minnesota alumni
Actresses from Minnesota
American women television writers
21st-century American women